is a Japanese football player. He plays for SC Sagamihara.

Career
Seiya Matsuki joined J3 League club SC Sagamihara in 2017.

Club statistics
Updated to 22 February 2018.

References

External links

1994 births
Living people
Osaka Sangyo University alumni
Association football people from Nara Prefecture
Japanese footballers
J3 League players
SC Sagamihara players
Association football forwards